Patricia Childress is a film and television actress, director, producer and writer who lives in Los Angeles where she works with many of the entertainment industry's most respected talents. Childress is the recipient of two Emmy Awards.

Life and career
Childress was born in Dallas, Texas. Her career began while still in high school. She was active in the Drama Club at John Foster Dulles High School in Sugar Land, Texas. In 1993,  she moved from her home in New York, where she studied visual arts at Marymount Manhattan College, to Los Angeles for an acting role in Reality Bites (1994), a movie written by her sister Helen Childress. Leaving behind her career as an artist, she continued acting, securing roles in television mini-series, award-winning films including As Good As It Gets, and Dead Man's Walk, a television film by writer Larry McMurty; Childress' work was commented on by the Los Angeles Times in a review appraising a "...sweetly compassionate performance by Patricia Childress."

She continued as an actor while producing a series for Oxygen in 2000 which she also directed and narrated, "As She Sees It." After independent production projects at MTV and CBS, she began an association with the Dr. Phil Show where she help to develop and create Dr. Phil's Ultimate Weight Loss Challenge which broke daytime ratings records in 2003. In 2005, Childress worked on the launch of model and television personality Tyra Banks program, The Tyra Banks Show. Earning two Emmys—2008 and 2009, each in the "Outstanding Talk Show/Information" category—she was the supervising creative producer and supervising field producer for five years for the popular daytime program.

Childress has launched four successful television shows: The Dr. Phil Ultimate Weight Loss Show, The Tyra Banks Show, The Talk and Anderson. She has written and produced programming with the A&E, Bravo, CBS, and VH1 networks. She recently produced and directed a series of Webisodes: Fa Fa Fa Fashion, with Vogue magazine contributing editor Andre Leon Talley and model Tyra Banks.

She is a member of the Directors Guild, the Writers Guild, and SAG-AFTRA. Patricia Childress and her husband, Daniel Rogers, a film and television editor and director, own and operate Mr. Ting Productions, Los Angeles.

References

External links
http://patriciachildress.com
http://www.mrtingproductions.com

Living people
American film actresses
American television actresses
21st-century American women
Year of birth missing (living people)